Euchromius nigrobasalis is a species of moth in the family Crambidae. It is found in Zimbabwe and South Africa.

The length of the forewings is 12–16 mm. The groundcolour of the forewings is white, densely suffused with dark brown to black scales. The hindwings are grey with a darkly bordered termen. Adults have been recorded in October and November.

References

Moths described in 1988
Crambinae
Moths of Africa